Batuhan Karadeniz (born 24 April 1991) is a Turkish professional footballer.

Started his career at İçerenköy Spor Kulübü at the age of 10, Karadeniz rose to fame at Süper Lig club Beşiktaş, where he player in youth levels between 2003 and 2007, and made his Süper Lig debut 2007-08 Season. He was also the youngest scorer of Süper Lig, scoring at the age of 16. Having disciplinary issues, Karadeniz left Beşiktaş in 2010 and player at Süper Lig level until the end of 2015–16, played at Eskişehirspor, Trabzon, Elazığspor and, Sivasspor. The following years he was rather a journey man, spending each and every season in different teams other than Bandırmaspor. A highly demanded player, he played in TFF First League and Second League play-offs between 2017 and 2022 in 4 different teams during his spells.

Being a prolific forward in youth levels, Karadeniz would represent Turkey only on two occasions, called up by Fatih Terim, between 2008 and 2009.

Club career

2003–2010: Beşiktaş J.K.

Karadeniz was regarded as a prospect player, scoring 226 goals in 86 matches at youth levels. His youth performance pulled attention of various clubs across European leagues.

In 2006, he signed a professional contract with Beşiktaş J.K.  At his professional season, he made his Super League debut against another Istanbul team Kasımpaşa on the 2nd matchday of the Turkish Football League 2007-08 Season as he had been substituted on for Burak Yılmaz at half time, making made him the youngest player ever to appear in a Süper Lig game at the tender age of just 16 years and 115 days. Just 6 days later, he scored his first goal for Beşiktaş on August 25 against Gaziantepspor in the 95th minute and made a big contribution to his team's 3 points.  Karadeniz became the youngest scorer ever at Süper Lig at the age of 16.

He made his UEFA Champions League debut against FC Zürich, making a substitute appearance in the 92nd minute, replacing Mert Nobre on 29 August 2007, where game ended 2–0 for Beşiktaş.

On 3 November 2007, Karadeniz came on as a substitute for Koray Avci in the 83rd minute against Fenerbahçe S.K. He missed a very crucial chance for Kara Kartallar during the additional time (90+3) as he picked up a loose ball and faked the keeper Volkan Demirel, subsequently he tried to shoot despite having had two teammates unmarked by his side and in the end he could not generate enough power on his shot and Edu cleared the ball away. Beşiktas lost the game with a final score of 2–1 to Fenerbahçe  overtook Beşiktaş by one point. Later, he said "You [must] be the king, you don't make someone else the king". Although he was criticized by the Turkish press that he should have assisted Federico Higuaín in the match, he stated that he had not seen his teammate at the time.

During the January 2008 transfer window Beşiktaş wanted to loan him out to F.C. Köln in order for him to get more playing time, however the transfer did not take place due to FIFA rules for each football federation regarding age. According to the German Football Association Karadeniz was classed as a minor and thus could not be transferred as he had a professional contract.

2010– : Later career
Karadeniz was loaned out Eskişehirspor during the January 2009 transfer window. He started his loan scoring four goals in three league matches.

At the end of the 2008–09 season Karadeniz had an operation of his left shoulder, ruling him out of football for five weeks. In the summer transfer window of 2010, Karadeniz has moved to Eskişehirspor with permanent deal. Then, he was loaned again to Beşiktaş. At the end of his contract he signed a new deal with Trabzonspor. After playing half of the season with Trabzonspor, he was loaned to Elazığspor. At the end of the season Trabzonspor terminated his contract. Before the beginning of the 2014–15 season he signed a new contract with Sivasspor.

On 16 July 2019, Karadeniz reagreed terms to extended his contract Balıkesirspor. Karadeniz scored twice at 9th week fixtures of 2018–19 TFF Second League Red Group game in which Balıkesirspor beat Niğde Belediyespor on 4–1 final score.

He joined Vanspor FK in the TFF Second League for the 2022–23 season, on 15 October 2022 his contract with Vanspor was terminated by mutual consent.

International career
Karadeniz has risen through the ranks of the Turkish national team. At the Under-16 and Under-17 levels he scored a total of 43 goals in 53 matches. At age 17 he was called up to the Turkish Under-21 squad to play in the U-21 European Championships qualifiers, making him the youngest player in the team.

He was first called up to the senior Turkish team by Fatih Terim during Turkey's 2010 world Cup Qualifiers in October 2008. He made his senior debut on 11 October 2008, winning his first cap in the Group 5 game against Bosnia & Herzegovina.

When he was only 18 years old, he was named as part of the squad for Turkey's friendly matches against the Ivory Coast in February 2009 but was an unused substitute. While playing at Sivasspor in August 2015, he was called-up on national team once again by Fatih Terim, up against UEFA Euro 2016 qualifying Group A encounters against Latvia and Netherlands.

Playing style
Standing at nearly two meters, Karadeniz has great aerial ability. He can play on the wings or in midfield as has scored many of his goals in this slightly more deeper position as a second striker.

Statistics

Club

International

References

External links

 
 
 
 
 
 

1991 births
People from Beyoğlu
Footballers from Istanbul
Living people
Turkish footballers
Turkey youth international footballers
Turkey under-21 international footballers
Turkey international footballers
Association football forwards
Beşiktaş J.K. footballers
Eskişehirspor footballers
Trabzonspor footballers
Elazığspor footballers
Sivasspor footballers
FC St. Gallen players
Şanlıurfaspor footballers
Sakaryaspor footballers
Adana Demirspor footballers
Bandırmaspor footballers
Tuzlaspor players
Süper Lig players
Swiss Super League players
TFF First League players
TFF Second League players
TFF Third League players
Turkish expatriate footballers
Expatriate footballers in Switzerland
Turkish expatriate sportspeople in Switzerland